Kassetten (English: Cassettes) is the fifth release of Einstürzende Neubauten's Musterhaus project, a series of highly experimental CD releases that were only available via an annual subscription through their website or from shows during their 25th Anniversary Tour. This project was separate from their Neubauten.org Supporter Project, which it ran concurrent to.

The concept of this Musterhaus release is providing a series of samples of cassette recordings that Einstürzende Neubauten has amassed over the years. As noted on the back of the album, in their earlier years every member of the band owned a cassette recorder and found it invaluable. Recorded were various audio experiments with friends, general field recordings of found sounds (such as the dismantling of a wardrobe, people entering a shop, expeditions to certain areas, etc.), tape noise experiments, answering machine recordings and nearly every interview they conducted during that time period.

Track listing
 "Outgoing Message (Berlin 1986/reconstructed 2006)" (Bargeld) – 0:20
 "Incoming Messages (Berlin 1986-1989/edited 2006)" (Bargeld) - 3:02
 "Décomposition d'un placard (pour obtenir une augmentation du comfort de la couchette) (Paris 29.10.82)" (Unruh/Hacke) - 1:44
 "Diverse Lokationen (Berlin West 1980-1983/performance 2006)" (Bargeld/Unruh/Hacke) - 8:18
 "Michael (Floral Park, New York 1983)" (Unruh) - 0:30
 "Verbalien (1980-1987/performance 2006)" (Bargeld/Unruh/Hacke) - 4:41
 "Atmosphären (Berlin West, April 1980 morgens)" (Bargeld) - 7:49
 "Supermarkt" - 2:01, "Dusche" - 0:26, "TV + gitarre" - 0:35, "Taxi" - 0:22, "SO 36" - 0:58, "Strasse" - 0:41, "U-Bahn" - 1:35, "Sendeschluss + gitarre" - 0:55, "Hinterhof" - 0:18
 "N.U.'s Gästeliste (Berlin 1986-1996)" (Unruh) - 5:17
 "Eisengrau All-Stars A (Berlin-Schöneberg in 1980)" - 6:41
 "Eisengrau All-Stars B (Berlin-Schöneberg in 1980)" - 5:22

Notes
Track 3 is the recording of N.U. Unruh dismantling a wardrobe in a Paris hotel room, to make his mattress provide more support.

Tracks 9 and 10 are recordings of one day of people entering and leaving Blixa Bargeld's 'Eisengrau' shop on Goltzstrasse 37.

Track 4 is a variety of diverse recording expeditions.

Digitized, compiled, mixed, and recorded by Alexander Hacke, N.U. Unruh, Blixa Bargeld, Boris Wilsdorf, and Macro Paschke in Berlin, Spring 2006
Produced by Einstürzende Neubauten
Mastered by Boris Wilsdorf

External links 
Musterhaus Project website

Einstürzende Neubauten albums
2006 albums